Pelleas und Melisande, Op. 5, is a symphonic poem written by Arnold Schoenberg and completed in February 1903. It was premiered on 25 January 1905 at the Musikverein in Vienna under the composer's direction in a concert that also included the first performance of Alexander von Zemlinsky's Die Seejungfrau. The work is based on Maurice Maeterlinck's play Pelléas and Mélisande, a subject suggested by Richard Strauss. When he began composing the work in 1902, Schoenberg was unaware that Claude Debussy's opera, also based on Maeterlinck's play, was about to premiere in Paris.

Instrumentation

The symphonic poem is scored for a large orchestra comprising piccolo, 3 flutes (3rd doubling 2nd piccolo), 3 oboes (3rd doubling 2nd English horn), English horn, E flat clarinet, 3 clarinets in B flat and A (3rd doubling 2nd bass clarinet), bass clarinet, 3 bassoons, contrabassoon, 8 horns in F, 4 trumpets in E and F, alto trombone, 4 tenor-bass trombones, tuba, timpani (2 players), triangle, cymbals, tam-tam, large tenor drum, bass drum, glockenspiel, 2 harps, and strings.

Structure
The work is in the key of D minor, and is an example of Schoenberg's early tonal works. It is one continuous movement which comprises many inter-related sections. The major sections are delineated by the following tempo markings:
 Die Achtel ein wenig bewegt – zögernd
 Heftig
 Lebhaft
 Sehr rasch
 Ein wenig bewegt
 Langsam
 Ein wenig bewegter
 Sehr langsam
 Etwas bewegt
 In gehender Bewegung
 Breit

Alban Berg provided a formal outline demonstrating a combination four movement symphonic form and a single movement sonata form with connections to scenes from the Maeterlinck play.

Theme groups, similar to the leitmotif, which are associated with individual scenes or people, form the building-blocks of a symphonic development, which has its beginning in the forest scene introducing the first movement, where Golaud meets Melisande and they marry, and continues on through the inner segments of the Scherzo, which portrays the scene at the fountain where Melisande loses her wedding ring and encounters with Golaud's half-brother Pelleas, and Adagio, which portrays the farewell and love scene of Pelleas and Melisande, where Golaud kills Pelleas, and leads to the recapitulation of the thematic material in the Finale, which portrays the death of Melisande. In a letter to his brother-in-law, Alexander Zemlinsky, who wanted to make cuts in Pelleas for a Prague performance he was to conduct in 1918, Schoenberg summarized the fundamental anchoring points of this work: "the opening motif (12/8) is linked to Melisande", which is followed by the "fate motif", and the Scherzo contains "the game with the ring", the Adagio the "scene with Melisande's Hair", and the "love scene; ... the dying Melisande" and "entrance of the ladies in waiting, Melisande's death" in the finale.

Melisande's themes are based on a three-note motive

common to several themes in the work.

 

The first Melisande theme is followed immediately by the "fate" theme.

After a forceful statement of the fate theme Pelleas' motif (which contains the three note motive from Melisande's theme) is introduced.

Influenced by Pillar of Fire, a ballet version of his Verklärte Nacht by Antony Tudor, which premiered in 1942 in New York, Schoenberg, in American exile, decided for commercial reasons to modify and arrange the work's score for ballet as well, by expanding the one-movement symphonic poem into a multi-movement suite. Schoenberg first spoke of this in early 1947, in a letter to his son-in-law Felix Greissle. However, the project collapsed due to the intervention of Associated Music Publishers, who managed to prevent authorization.

Selected discography 
 Pelléas et Mélisande. Gabriel Fauré, Arnold Schoenberg. Hans Vonk, Saint Louis Symphony Orchestra. PENTATONE PTC 5186324 (2008).
 Pelleas und Melisande (coupled with Variationen für Orchester op.31). Chicago Symphony Orchestra / Pierre Boulez. Erato 2292-45827-2 (1992)

References

Further reading
 Schoenberg, Arnold. Five Orchestral Pieces and Pelleas und Melisande in full score. New York: Dover Publications reprint of two CF Peters originals (1912), 1994. .

External links
 

Compositions by Arnold Schoenberg
Symphonic poems
1903 compositions
Adaptations of works by Maurice Maeterlinck